Heptanitrocubane   is an experimental high explosive based on the cubic eight-carbon cubane molecule and closely related to octanitrocubane.  Seven of the eight hydrogen atoms at the corners of the cubane molecule are replaced by nitro groups, giving the final molecular formula .

As with octanitrocubane, not enough heptanitrocubane has been synthesized to perform detailed tests on its stability and energy.  It is hypothesized to have slightly better performance than explosives such as HMX, the current high-energy standard explosive, based on chemical energy analysis.  While in theory not as energetic as octanitrocubane's theoretical maximum density, the HNC that has been synthesized so far is a more effective explosive than any ONC that has been produced, due to more efficient crystal packing and hence higher density.

Heptanitrocubane was first synthesized by the same team who synthesized octanitrocubane, Philip Eaton and Mao-Xi Zhang at the University of Chicago, in 1999.

References

Further reading

Explosive chemicals
Nitroalkanes